The North Eastern Railway Class S (LNER Class B13) was a 4-6-0 type of steam locomotive designed for express passenger workings. The first example was built in 1899. They were very similar to the NER Class S1, except for the smaller wheels of the former.

Design
They were designed to reduce double heading on the East Coast Main Line. However they steamed poorly, with a smaller and shallower grate than was used even by other locomotives at the time (a problem which also affected the B14s and later, the B15s), and the 4-4-0s of the NER Class R quickly replaced them, with the 4-4-2 layout being preferred for later express passenger designs. The class were re-classified as London and North Eastern Railway Class B13 in 1923.

Modifications
The first seven locomotives had slide valves, while the remainder had piston valves. The slide valve engines were later fitted with piston valves.  Schmidt superheaters were fitted between 1913 and 1925.

Numbering

Withdrawal
They were withdrawn between 1928 and 1938.

References

External links
 

4-6-0 locomotives
S
Railway locomotives introduced in 1899
Scrapped locomotives
Standard gauge steam locomotives of Great Britain
Passenger locomotives